Elisa-Honorine Champin (Paris - 1871 Sceaux, Hauts-de-Seine) was a French watercolourist and lithographer who specialised in painting flowers, fruit and vegetables.  She studied under Mlle. Riché and exhibited at the Salon under her maiden name, Pitet, from 1833 to 1836. After marrying French painter Jean-Jacques Champin (1796-1860) in 1837 she exhibited under her married name. She contributed a series of vegetable posters to Le Jardin Potager (1850-1884) - these were printed by Lemercier & Cie. for use as advertisements by the firm Vilmorin-Andrieux, a leading wholesaler of seeds.

References

External links
Gallery of vegetables

Botanical illustrators
Women lithographers
19th-century French women artists